William James "Bill" Hartley (born June 12, 1945) was a child care worker, restaurant owner and political figure in British Columbia, Canada. He represented Maple Ridge-Pitt Meadows in the Legislative Assembly of British Columbia from 1991 to 2001 as a member of the NDP. He served as Speaker of the assembly from 2000 to 2001.

He was born in Vancouver, British Columbia, the son of Fred Hartley and Betty MacPherson, and was educated at Simon Fraser University. He served on the town council for Maple Ridge from 1983 to 1987 and was mayor from 1987 to 1990. In 1992, he married Alice Arnot Muir and became a father to Wallis Hartley.

References 

1945 births
Living people
British Columbia municipal councillors
British Columbia New Democratic Party MLAs
Mayors of places in British Columbia
Politicians from Vancouver
Simon Fraser University alumni
Speakers of the Legislative Assembly of British Columbia